Shesh i Zi (lit. "black field") is an Albanian red wine variety.

References

Albanian wine